Woodstock School is an international coeducational residential school located in Landour, a small hill station contiguous with the town of Mussoorie, Uttarakhand, India, in the foothills of the Himalayas.

Woodstock is one of the oldest residential schools in Asia, operating today as a private nonprofit institution with Indian Christian Minority Status. Woodstock offers kindergarten through Grade 12 instruction, with a residence programme beginning in Grade 6. It is fully accredited by the Middle States Association, the first school in Asia to receive accreditation in 1960. In 2019 Woodstock School was officially accredited as an International Baccalaureate (IB) World School, with full authorisation for both the IB Middle Years Programme (MYP) and Diploma Programme (DP). It is also regarded as one of the most expensive schools in India.

History
Woodstock was founded in 1854 and has been on its current campus since 1856. First managed as a girls’ school with staff provided by an English mission, there came an increasing demand from missionaries for a school in North India with an American curriculum to prepare students for American colleges and universities. By 1928, a full American coeducational programme had been introduced at Woodstock. In 1959, Woodstock was the third high school outside North America and the first school in Asia to receive US accreditation through the Middle States Association of Colleges and Secondary Schools.

During the 1960s, cross-cultural courses in social studies, literature, art, and religion were introduced, and Indian classical music and dance lessons were added. Indian universities became more accepting of the Woodstock Diploma, and in 1990 the Association of Indian Universities recognized the Woodstock Diploma as being equivalent to the Indian school-leaving examination, thus allowing graduates to enter Indian universities with greater ease. 

In the 1960s and 1970s Woodstock began to rethink its composition, purpose, and philosophy as an institution. The school consciously shifted its conception from that of a missionary school to a school consisting of an international student body, staff, and curriculum, with a strong Indian cultural component. This change to a truly international school was led by Robert Alter, Principal from 1968 to 1978. With the increasing internationalization of the student body, an English as a Second Language (ESL) programme was established in 1978.

In recent years, Woodstock has placed a priority on its academic programming with renovations to classrooms and laboratories, and a move to the International Baccalaureate curriculum. Woodstock officially became an International Baccalaureate World School in May 2019, with full authorisation for both the IB Middle Years Programme (MYP) and Diploma Programme (DP). The Class of 2021 was the first Woodstock students to graduate with both an American High School Diploma and the International Baccalaureate Diploma.

In 2004, Woodstock celebrated 150 years of its journey. The Government of India issued a Woodstock School commemorative postage stamp in 2004.

Alumni organizations
The Woodstock Old Students Association (WOSA) was founded in 1911 and has chapters in many countries.

The alumni organization serving the North America region is a 501(c)3 entity: Friends of Woodstock School.  FWS is the successor to Kodai-Woodstock International (KWI), and organizes an annual alumni reunion in North America.  FWS maintains an alumni database and provides an umbrella for smaller "Curry Club" groups that convene on an ad-hoc basis.

Affiliations
 International Baccalaureate(IB)
 Council of International Schools (CIS)
 Global Alliance for Innovative Learning (GAIL)
 Association of International Schools in India (TAISI)
 Boarding Schools Association (BSA)
 National Association of Independent Schools (NAIS)
 Academy for International School Heads (AISH)
 Headmasters' and Headmistresses' Conference (HMC)
 Council for Advancement and Support of Education (CASE)
 National Honor Society (NHS)

Notable alumni
 Chris Anderson, publisher (founder of Future Publishing and owner, CEO and Curator of TED (1974)
 Martha (Marty) Chen (née Alter), academic, scholar and social worker (1960)
 Tom Alter, actor (1968)
 Stephen Alter, author (1974)
 George H. Carley, Former Chief Justice of the Supreme Court of Georgia (1956)
 Robert Griffiths, physicist (1952)
 Jonathan Mark Kenoyer, anthropologist (1970)
 Dilshad Najmuddin, Pakistani Inspector-General police officer and ambassador to the Holy See (1945)
 Ruchi Narain, film maker
 Pernia Qureshi, fashion entrepreneur, designer (2002)
 Dorothy Riddle, psychologist (1960)
 Nayantara Sahgal, writer (1943)
 Henry Scholberg, author (1939) 
 Robert E. Scott, law professor (1962)
 Carl E. Taylor, international health expert (1932)
 Jay Smith, American Christian evangelist, apologist and polemicist.
 Kate Forbes, Cabinet Secretary for Finance and the Economy, Scottish Government.

References

External links

Woodstock School website
The Woodstocker: online student newspaper
Best Boarding Schools website

International schools in India
Schools in Colonial India
Christian schools in Uttarakhand
High schools and secondary schools in Uttarakhand
Private schools in Uttarakhand
Boarding schools in Uttarakhand
Education in Dehradun district
Mussoorie
Educational institutions established in 1854
1854 establishments in India